Rincon Creek may refer to:
 Rincon Creek (Pantano Wash), a tributary of the Santa Cruz River (Arizona) in Pima County, Arizona
 Rincon Creek, an alternative name for Brush Creek (Sonoma County, California)
 Rincon Creek (Southern California), a creek that marks the boundary between Santa Barbara and Ventura County, California.
 Rincon Creek (Merced County, California)
 Rincon Creek (Santa Clara County, California) 
 Rincon Creek (Sonoma County, California)